Lovitt is a surname. Notable people with the surname include:

Benji Lovitt (born 1974), Israeli-American comedian, educator and writer
Colin Lovitt, Australian barrister
Hayley Lovitt (born 1986), American actress and production coordinator
John Lovitt (1832–1908), Canadian ship’s captain, shipowner, shipbuilder, entrepreneur and politician
Robin Lovitt (born 1963), American convicted murderer

See also 
Cape Lovitt, is the westernmost point of New Zealand
Lovitt Records, is an independent record  in Greensboro, North Carolina